The 2004–05 Midland Football Alliance season was the eleventh in the history of Midland Football Alliance, a football competition in England.

Clubs and league table
The league featured 19 clubs from the previous season, along with three new clubs:
Loughborough Dynamo, promoted from the Leicestershire Senior League
Malvern Town, promoted from the West Midlands (Regional) League
Romulus, promoted from the Midland Football Combination

League table

References

External links
 Midland Football Alliance

2004–05
9